DC3 or DC-3 may refer to:

Academics 
 Dodge City Community College, Kansas

Music
 DC3 (band), a defunct American rock band
 The DC3, a defunct Australian rock band

Transportation
 Datsun DC-3, a 1952 automobile 
 Douglas DC-3, a 1930s aircraft
 North American DC-3, a cancelled space shuttle design

Other
 DC3 Music Group, a multi-media entertainment company
 Device Control Three, a control codes used in text by computer systems
 Department of Defense Cyber Crime Center (DC3), a United States defense organization